Gošić is a hamlet in the municipality of Kistanje, Šibenik-Knin County, in the Bukovica region of Croatia.

History
8 Serb civilians in the village of Gošić were shot and killed on 27 August 1995, in the aftermath of the Croatian Army's Operation Storm.

Demographics
According to the 2011 population census, the population of Gošić was made up of only 46 returnees. This represents 42.99% of its pre-war population according to the 1991 census.

According to the 1991 census, 99.07% of the village population were ethnic Serbs (106/107).

References

populated places in Šibenik-Knin County
Serb communities in Croatia